HAT-P-17 is a K-type main-sequence star about  away. It is the host of two planets, HAT-P-17b and HAT-P-17c, both discovered in 2010. A search for a binary companion star using adaptive optics at the MMT Observatory was negative. A candidate companion was detected by a spectroscopic search of high-resolution K band infrared spectra taken at the Keck observatory.

Planetary system
In 2010 a multi-planet system consisting of a transiting hot Saturn in an eccentric orbit and a Jupiter like planet in an outer orbit was detected. The transiting planet HAT-P-17b was detected by the HATNet Project using telescopes located in Hawaii, Arizona and at Wise Observatory in Israel. It was confirmed with radial velocity measurements taken at the Keck telescope which also led to the discovery of the second planet on a much wider orbit. In 2013 radial velocity measurements of the Rossiter-McLaughlin effect showed that the sky-projected angle between the stellar spin axis and the orbit of planet b was approximately 19°. The measurement in 2022 have resulted in slightly larger misalignment of 26.3°

References

Cygnus (constellation)
K-type main-sequence stars
Planetary systems with two confirmed planets
Planetary transit variables